General elections were held in Montserrat in 1943.

Electoral system
The Legislative Council had nine seats; four elected, three held by government officials and two by nominees appointed by the Governor.

Results
Amongst the four elected members was Robert William Griffith, the first MLC not from the merchant and planter class.

References

Elections in Montserrat
Montserrat
General election
Election and referendum articles with incomplete results